Ashour Ben Khayal, sometimes romanised Ben Hayal, is a Libyan diplomat and politician who was born in the Cyrenaican city of Derna in September 1939. He was named Foreign Minister on 22 November 2011 by Abdurrahim El-Keib in a surprise move, as the position was originally reported to be filled by Libya's deputy ambassador to United Nations Ibrahim Dabbashi. He was described as little-known prior to his appointment.

Biography 
Ben Khayal was previously the first secretary at the Libyan embassy in Rome in the late 1960s. Bin Khayal served as Libya's First Secretary and Adviser for the Libyan Mission to the United Nations, New York at the UN Security Council during Libya’s 1976-1977 membership term. During his term at the UN he also worked in the capacity of Deputy Delegate with Mansour Rashid El-Kikhia. He was also Libya’s ambassador to Korea but resigned in 1984 after a gunman fired from the Libyan embassy in London at a protest outside, killing police officer Yvonne Fletcher.

After defecting, Bin Khayal joined the ranks of the Libyan National resistance and was later named the Deputy Secretary General of the National Libyan Alliance. In 2005, after the killing of Kikhia, he served as Chairman and later as president for the National Conference of the Libyan Opposition. During the Libyan Civil War, the Conference declared support for the National Transitional Council and allocated all possible resources towards the service of the nation.

External links
 Libyan Foreign Ministry 
 Interim Government Official website (Executive Office)

References

Government ministers of Libya
Libyan diplomats
Living people
Members of the National Transitional Council
Members of the Interim Government of Libya
Libyan Sunni Muslims
1939 births
University of Libya alumni
People from Derna, Libya
Libyan National Movement politicians
Ambassadors of Libya to South Korea